KW Sagittarii is a red supergiant, located approximately  away from the Sun in the direction of the constellation Sagittarius. It is one of the largest-known stars. If placed at the center of the Solar System, the star's surface would engulf Mars.

Variability

KW Sagitarii was discovered to be variable in 1928 from a study of photographic plates. It varies erratically in brightness over a range of about two magnitudes. It is classified as a semiregular variable, although the listed period of 670 days is poorly defined. The peculiar cool spectrum has led to comparisons with symbiotic variables, but it is no longer considered to be a cataclysmic binary.

Distance
A distance of 2,420 parsecs is based on the assumption of membership on the Sagittarius OB5 association. The parallax derived from the Hipparcos mission is negative so doesn't give much information about the distance except that it is likely to be large. The Gaia result carries a significant statistical margin of error, as well as an indicator that the astrometric excess noise is far beyond acceptable levels so that the parallax should be considered unreliable.

Characteristics
KW Sagittarii is classed as a luminous cool supergiant and varies its spectral type between M0 and M4. The star was then described as among the four largest and most luminous galactic red supergiants, which includes V354 Cephei, KY Cygni and Mu Cephei. 

See also
 VX Sagittarii — another red supergiant (RSG) in the constellation Sagittarius

Notes

References

External links 
Space.Com
Universe Today

Sagittarius (constellation)
Semiregular variable stars
M-type supergiants
087433
316496
Sagittarii, KW
Durchmusterung objects
TIC objects